Sidi Ali–Kinetik Sports Pro Cycling Team is a Moroccan professional road bicycle racing team that was founded in 2020.

Team roster

Major results
Bouskoura Ligue Casablanca Settat, Mounir Al Azhari
Stages 3 & 6 Tour du Cameroun, Nasser Eddine Maatougui

National Champions
 Morocco U23 Road Race, Nasser Eddine Maatougui

References

External links

Cycling teams established in 2020
UCI Continental Teams (Africa)
Cycling teams based in Morocco